Elections to the Himachal Pradesh Legislative Assembly were held in May 1982, to elect members of the 68 constituencies in Himachal Pradesh, India. The Indian National Congress won the most seats as well as the popular vote, and Thakur Ram Lal was reappointed as the Chief Minister of Himachal Pradesh.

After the passing of the State of Himachal Pradesh Act, 1970, Himachal Pradesh was converted from a Union Territory to a State and the size of its Legislative Assembly was increased to 68 members.

Result

Elected Members

See also 
 List of constituencies of the Himachal Pradesh Legislative Assembly
 1982 elections in India

References

Himachal Pradesh
1982
1982